The Seventy-ninth Amendment of the Constitution of India, officially known as The Constitution (Seventy-ninth Amendment) Act, 1999, extended the period of reservation of seats for the Scheduled Castes and Scheduled Tribes and representation of the Anglo-Indians in the Lok Sabha and the State Legislative Assemblies for another ten years, i.e. up to 26 January 2010.

Article 334 of the Constitution had originally required the reservation of seats to cease in 1960, but this was extended to 1970 by the 8th Amendment. The period of reservation was extended to 1980, 1990, and 2000 by the 23rd, 45th and 62nd Amendments respectively. The 79th Amendment extended this period to 2010. The period of reservation was further extended to 2020 and 2030 by the 95th and 104th Amendments.

Text

The full text of Article 334 of the Constitution, after the 79th Amendment, is given below:

Proposal and enactment
The bill of The Constitution (Seventy-ninth Amendment) Act, 1999 was introduced in the Lok Sabha on 26 October 1999, as the Constitution (Eighty-fourth Amendment) Bill, 1999 (Bill No. 67 of 1999). It was introduced by Ram Jethmalani, then Minister of Law, Justice and Company Affairs, and sought to amend article 334 of the Constitution relating to reservation of seats for the Scheduled Castes and the Scheduled Tribes and special representation of the Anglo-Indian community in the House of the People and in the Legislative Assemblies of the States. The full text of the Statement of Objects and Reasons appended to the bill is given below:

The Bill was considered by the Lok Sabha on 27 October 1999, and was passed on the same day with a formal amendment changing the short title from "Eighty-fourth" to "Seventy-ninth". The Bill, as passed by the Lok Sabha, was debated and passed by the Rajya Sabha on 28 October 1999. The bill, after ratification by the States, received assent from then President K. R. Narayanan on 21 January 2000, and was notified in The Gazette of India on the same date. The 79th Amendment came into force on 25 January 2000.

Ratification
The Act was passed in accordance with the provisions of Article 368 of the Constitution, and was ratified by more than half of the State Legislatures, as required under Clause (2) of the said article. State Legislatures that ratified the amendment are listed below:

 Assam
 Bihar
 Goa
 Haryana
 Himachal Pradesh
 Karnataka
 Kerala
 Maharashtra
 Manipur
 Mizoram
 Nagaland
 Orissa
 Tamil Nadu
 Uttar Pradesh
 West Bengal

Did not ratify:
 Andhra Pradesh
 Arunachal Pradesh
 Gujarat
 Jammu and Kashmir
 Madhya Pradesh
 Meghalaya
 Punjab
 Rajasthan
 Sikkim
 Tripura

See also
List of amendments of the Constitution of India

References

79
1999 in India
1999 in law
Vajpayee administration